Lithomoia is a genus of moths of the family Noctuidae.

Species
 Lithomoia germana (Morrison, 1874)
 Lithomoia solidaginis (Hübner, [1803])

References
Natural History Museum Lepidoptera genus database
Lithomoia at funet

Cuculliinae